Judas is a 1936 Mexican drama film directed by Manuel R. Ojeda and starring Josefina Escobedo, Carlos Villatoro and Víctor Urruchúa. The film's sets were designed by the art director José Rodríguez Granada.

Cast
 Josefina Escobedo as Magdalena  
 Carlos Villatoro as Emilio  
 Víctor Urruchúa as Traidor  
 Manuel Buendía as Hacendado  
 Victorio Blanco as Judas  
 Carlos López 
 Arturo Manrique 
 Esther Fernandez 
 Manuel Noriega
 Consuelo Segarra
 Gilberto González 
 Max Langler 
 María Díaz de León
 Isauro Ruiz
 Alfonso Parra

References

Bibliography 
 Emilio García Riera. Historia documental del cine mexicano: 1929–1937. Universidad de Guadaljara, 1992.

External links 
 

1936 films
1936 drama films
Mexican drama films
1930s Spanish-language films
Films directed by Manuel R. Ojeda
Mexican black-and-white films
1930s Mexican films